Isabel de Warenne, Countess of Arundel (c. 1228 – 23 November 1282) was an English peer. She was widowed before she was 20 years old, with a large estate, upon which she founded a  Cistercian order convent, England's only convent to be Cistercian at the time of its founding. In 1252, she rebuked King Henry III for not paying her money she was owed.

Biography
De Warenne was born between 1226 and 1230, her father was William de Warenne, 5th Earl of Surrey and her mother was Maud Marshall, Countess of Norfolk, both of whom had been widowed previously and married in 1225. The de Warenne's also had a son in 1231, John de Warenne, 6th Earl of Surrey. Through her grandfather, Hamelin Plantagenet, the illegitimate half-brother of Henry II, Isabel was a cousin of king Henry III. In 1234, somewhere between the ages of eight and 12, she was married to Hugh d’Aubigny, 5th Earl of Arundel, and the couple moved to Marham, Norfolk.  

D'Aubigny died in 1243, by which time De Warenne's father and uncles had died, leaving her as a teenage widow with a small fortune. She retained the title "Countess of Arundel", despite the Arundel estates being distributed amongst D'Aubigny's sisters.  She was a religious patron and in 1249 she founded Marham Abbey in Norfolk on part of her land, the only English convent that was part of the Cistercian order at its founding.

In 1252, upon the death of Thomas of Ingoldisthorpe, King Henry III took possession of his lands. However Thomas was a tenant of de Warenne's, and owed her a quarter of a knight's fee, so de Warenne requested the value from the King. Henry refused and De Warenne complained about this behaviour to his face, suggesting that the Magna Carta was being ignored. She then left the Henry's court, without obtaining permission. Henry would pay back the debt a year later, and forgive the fine that she had been charged in appealing the case.

References 

Isabel
13th-century English people
13th-century English women
Daughters of British earls
Arundel
Year of birth uncertain